The Airbus Helicopters H145 (formerly Eurocopter EC145) is a twin-engine light utility helicopter developed and manufactured by Airbus Helicopters. Originally designated as the BK 117, the H145 is based upon the MBB/Kawasaki BK 117 C1, which became a part of the combined Eurocopter line-up in 1992 with the merger of Messerschmitt-Bölkow-Blohm's helicopter division of Daimler-Benz into Eurocopter. The helicopter was earlier named EC145; an updated version, EC145 T2, was renamed H145 in 2015.

The H145 is a twin-engine aircraft and can carry up to nine passengers along with two crew, depending on customer configuration. The helicopter is marketed for passenger transport, corporate transport, emergency medical services (EMS), search and rescue, parapublic and utility roles.

Military variants of the helicopter have also been produced under various designations, such as H145M or UH-72, and have been used for training, logistics, medical evacuation, reconnaissance, light attack, and troop-transport operations.

Development

Origins

The EC145 was a joint development between Messerschmitt-Bölkow-Blohm, subsequently Eurocopter and Kawasaki Heavy Industries on the basis of their successful prior jointly produced BK 117 C1. Rather than pursuing an entirely clean sheet design, the forward cockpit and modern avionics of Eurocopter's EC 135 were adopted in combination with the proven BK 117's rear section; Flight International described the new helicopter, originally designed as BK 117 C2, as being "90% a combination of these two aircraft [The EC135 and BK 117 C1]". However, there were significant areas of redesign, advantages held by the EC145 over its predecessor include possessing a greater range and payload capacity, a considerably increased and uninterrupted cabin area, reduced vibration and noise emissions, and measures to simplify maintenance and minimise operational costs. The noise signature of the EC145 is reportedly 60% lower than that of the BK 117 C1.

The new model was type-certificated as the BK 117 C2; in December 1997, it was selected by the French Defense and Civil Guard for air rescue mission, 31 EC145s were ordered to replace their fleet of ageing Aérospatiale Alouette III in a deal costing $170 million. The first EC145 completed its maiden flight at Donauwörth, Germany, on 12 June 1999; Eurocopter conducted a major publicity event for the emerging type at the US Helicopter Association International Show in February 2000. Safety certification of the EC145 was awarded by the German Luftfahrt-Bundesamt and Japanese Civil Aviation Bureau in December 2000; and by the United States Federal Aviation Administration (FAA) in January 2002.

Eurocopter and Kawasaki have an agreement to independently manufacture and market the rotorcraft, while working collaboratively on development and upgrades. Eurocopter has a 60% production workshare, which includes the main and tail rotors, intermediate and tail gearboxes, control systems, cockpit and tail structure, and landing gear; Kawasaki has a 40% workshare, comprising the fuselage structure, main transmission, electrical and fuel systems.<ref>"A Marriage that Lasted." Flight International, p. 30. 31 May 2004.</ref> Kawasaki uses the designation BK 117 C2 for the type and sells/produces the aircraft in the Asian market; Eurocopter sells the type globally under the EC145 designation. In November 2004, with the termination of production of Mitsubishi Heavy Industries' MH2000, the BK 117 C2 became the only civil helicopter in production in Japan. In August 2010, it was announced that the partnership between Eurocopter and Kawasaki on the development and production of the EC145 had been extended until at least 2025.

Further development

In 2011, Eurocopter launched an upgraded EC145 model, designated EC145 T2, unveiling the new type at Heli Expo 2011. The EC145 T2 is designed to significantly increase the aircraft's performance, featuring new Arriel 2E turboshaft engines, dual-digital Full Authority Digital Engine Controls (FADEC), Eurocopter's Fenestron shrouded tail rotor design, and upgraded tail and main rotor gear boxes. Considerable differences and improvements were introduced to the cockpit and aircraft subsystems, including the adoption of increasingly digital avionics and a fully modular approach to these systems; amongst the biggest changes is a sophisticated 4-axis autopilot. In April 2014, airworthiness certification from the European Aviation Safety Agency for the EC145 T2 was received, FAA certification followed in October 2014.

The primary manufacturing facility for the EC145 is located at Donauwörth in Germany, which is Eurocopter's second-largest site after Marignane in France. In 2014, Airbus Helicopters announced that 50 EC145 T2s would be manufactured in 2015; the production is expected to eventually rise to 70 helicopters per year.

Since 2011, Eurocopter has been developing an optionally piloted vehicle (OPV) variant of the EC145. Test flights of the EC145 OPV, including unmanned flights, began in 2013. The system, designed to plug into the EC145's existing avionics, is capable of autonomous operation or alternatively being controlled by human operators either via the cockpit or from a ground control station. The technology, which is reported to be compatible with a number of Eurocopter's range of helicopters, is intended for both civil and military applications. In an emergency situation, such as systems failure, the EC145 OPV is programmed to enter into an automated hover-to-land procedure to safely land the aircraft. In March 2015, Airbus Helicopter's Chief Technical Officer Jean-Brice Dumont stated that there were no firm plans for the EC145 OPV to proceed to production, but investment in the project was continuing.

In July 2014, Airbus Helicopter launched the EC145e, a lightened and lower cost version of the standard EC145, achieved by the removal of some avionics for autopilot and single-pilot IFR functions. Intended as a basic model for tasks such as aerial firefighting and utility work, it has been also viewed as a replacement for aging MBB Bo 105 rotorcraft.Perry, Dominic. "Airbus Helicopters launches reduced weight EC145." Flight International, 31 July 2014. In April 2015, the EASA issued its certification for the EC145e. In 2015, Metro Aviation entered into an arrangement with Airbus Helicopters to offer various mission-specific customisations for the EC145e and operate as a reseller for the variant. In 2015, the EC145 was rebranded as the H145 by Airbus Helicopters.

In March 2019, Airbus Helicopters announced that it was developing, in cooperation with Japanese manufacturer Kawasaki, an upgraded model of the H145. Chiefly amongst its new features were a new bearingless five-bladed main rotor that incorporates the Blue Edge rotor blade, the testing of which had commenced in April 2018. Furthermore, such changes are able to be retrofitted to existing H145s. EASA certification is expected in the first quarter of 2020.

Design
Other improvements over the BK 117 include an increased maximum take-off weight and greater range, achieved partially by the adoption of composite rotor blades, which were derived from the smaller EC135. The EC145 has a hingeless rotor system with a monolithic titanium hub; the helicopter was originally powered by a pair of Turboméca Arriel 1E2 turboshaft engines, later aircraft are powered by the upgraded Turboméca Arriel 2E engine. A key feature of the rotorcraft is the variable rotorspeed and torque matching system (VARTOMS), derived from the BK 117, which Eurocopter has attributed as making the EC145 "the quietest helicopter in its class".

The EC145 is fitted with an all-glass cockpit, consists of a Thales Avionics MEGHAS Flight Control Display System with active matrix liquid crystal displays (LCDs); it can be piloted by either one or two pilots. A number of systems are independently redundant, including the autopilot system, hydraulic boost, transmission lubrication, and some of the onboard sensors. The EC145 T2 features additional and newer avionics systems, such as a full 4-axis autopilot and dual-channel Full Authority Digital Engine Control (FADEC); three large LCD primary displays were also introduced to control these systems. The type is fully capable of Category A operations; in November 2008, an EC145 performed the first medical transport flights under instrument flight rules (IFR) in Europe; the type is able to fly entirely under GPS navigation from takeoff to final approach when required. The EC145 is also the first civil helicopter to be fitted with night vision-compatible cockpit instrumentation and lighting straight off the production line.Dubois, Thierry. "European medical operators give the EC 145 high marks." AIN Online, 30 October 2006.

Typical cabin arrangements allows for eight passengers in a club seating configuration, or nine passengers in a high density seating configuration, passenger seating is designed for quick rearrangement based upon current demands. The cabin can be accessed either through sliding doors in either side of the aircraft or via large clamshell doors at the rear of the cabin; in combination with the high mounted tail boom, the clamshell doors are designed to provide safe clearance for loading and unloading activities even while the rotors are turning. In an EMS/casualty evacuation arrangement, the EC145 can carry up to two stretchered patients with three accompanying medical staff. The helicopter can be fitted with emergency floats, rescue hoist, search light, load hook and specialist equipment for other operational requirements.

A VIP variant the Stylence was launched in 2008 for corporate and private helicopter operators which has various aesthetic and technology changes from the baseline model to provide a higher level of passenger comfort. The Stylence features a luxury interior with a variety of seating configurations, leather seats, carbon fibre inserts, carpet, optional sliding wall in rear of the cabin and optional console with cold box.  In 2011, Eurocopter launched the 
high-end Mercedes-Benz Style VIP variant developed in association with the Mercedes-Benz Advanced Design Division. The Mercedes-Benz Style features several seating configurations for between four and eight passengers with the option of up to three multipurpose cabinets via switchable rail-mountings, three trim and upholstery levels with wooden panelling, advanced in-flight entertainment system and adjustable ambient lighting. The seats can be removed to create space for luggage with anchoring options on the floor and walls. The Mercedes-Benz Style also features external changes including a reshaped forward section and modified landing skids. In 2017, Airbus Helicopters launched the Airbus Corporate Helicopters (ACH) brand for corporate variants with two product lines for the H145 assigned the marketing name ACH145: the ACH145 Line, formerly the Stylence, and the ACH145 Editions product line, which retained the Mercedes-Benz Style name. The EC145e, a utility variant, has a deliberately standardised interior for the purpose of minimising overall weight.

Operational history

The French Sécurité Civile (Civil Guard), French Gendarmerie and the Landespolizei (State Police) of Hesse, Germany became the first operators of the EC145 upon receipt of the initial deliveries in April 2002. The Sécurité Civile procured the type as a replacement for its aging Aérospatiale Alouette III fleet, winning out against the Eurocopter AS365 Dauphin. In November 2006, the Sécurité Civile were planning to make greater use of the EC145's IFR capabilities for operations within bad weather and at night time. In 2008, the Gendarmerie reportedly stated that the EC145 has a per aircraft availability rate of roughly 90 percent. Out of a total of 32 EC145s delivered to the Sécurité Civile, three had been lost in accidents by June 2009.Dubois, Thierry. "French rescue org suffers third fatal EC 145 crash." AIN Online, 3 June 2009.

In October 2010, an agreement to establish a joint venture between Eurocopter and Kazakhstan Engineering, Eurocopter Kazakhstan Engineering, was formally signed; the joint venture created the only EC145 manufacturer in the Commonwealth of Independent States (CIS), which possesses exclusive rights to supply the type to Mongolia, Uzbekistan, Tajikistan, Kyrgyzstan, Belarus, and Azerbaijan."Kazakhstan strengthens relations with Airbus Group." Azernews, 3 November 2015. In November 2011, Kazakhstan took delivery of the first of an initial batch of six EC145 ordered. In September 2012, Eurocopter Kazakhstan received its first EC145 assembly kits at its newly established facility in Astana; up to 10 EC145s per year are to be built at the facility. By November 2015, a total of 20 rotorcraft had been produced at the Kazakhstan facility, 14 for the Ministry of Emergencies of Kazakhstan and 6 for the Ministry of Defense of Kazakhstan.

In April 2012, Eurocopter announced that the 500th EC145 had been delivered. On 31 July 2014, the first EC145 T2, an updated variant, was delivered to its launch customer, DRF Luftrettung, who have ordered a total of 20 such helicopters for emergency medical service operations.

In April 2015, Airbus Group Australia Pacific delivered its first H145, previously designated as the EC145 T2. In June 2015, it was announced that Saudi Arabia intended to purchase 23 H145s worth $500 million. In November 2015, it was reported that the H145 had attained an average availability rate of 94%.

On 25 September 2019 an Airbus H145 landed on the summit of Aconcagua, highest mountain in Southern Hemisphere at 6962 metres (22,840 ft), crewed by Airbus experimental test pilot Alexander Neuhaus and flight test engineer Antoine van Gent. This is a record for a twin-engined helicopter.

Military
In 2006, the UH-145, a military variant of the EC145, was selected for the United States Army's Light Utility Helicopter Program, beating three other helicopters. The deal, valued at $3 billion, involved the supply and servicing of 345 helicopters, with options for additional aircraft. The variant was designated UH-72 Lakota by the US Department of Defense; the first UH-72A was delivered to the US Army in December 2006. In August 2007, the FAA authorised the commencement of production of both UH-72A and civil EC145 rotorcraft at American Eurocopter's facility in Columbus, Mississippi.

In July 2013, Germany purchased 15 EC145s for the German Army to be used for special operations (KSK) designated EC645 T2. The EC645 T2 is armed with weapon mounts, fitted with electronic countermeasures system, ballistic protection, electro-optical system, fast rope system, cargo hooks and hoists. In October 2014, Thailand placed an order for 5 EC645 T2s for the Royal Thai Navy. On 27 November 2014, the maiden flight of the EC645 T2 was performed at Donauwörth, Germany. On 15 May 2015, the H145M, previously designated as EC645 T2, received EASA airworthiness certification. The first two H145Ms were received by Germany and assigned to the Air Force in December 2015.

In December 2016, Serbia placed an order for 9 H145Ms with 6 for the Serbian Air Force and Air Defence, four of the six to be equipped with the HForce weapon system, and 3 for the Police of Serbia. In November 2018, Serbia changed the distribution of the H145Ms; the Police to receive an additional H145M and the Serbian Air Force and Air Defence to receive one less H145M with three equipped with HForce. In November 2017, Airbus completed the first test fire of the HForce modular weapon system. HForce will enable the H145M hardpoints to be armed with the M3P .50-caliber machine gun, M621 20mm automatic cannon and FZ231 70mm rocket launcher and will equip the H145M with a Wescam MX-15 electro-optical targeting system and Scorpion helmet mounted sight display. In December 2017, Airbus successfully launched FZ275 70mm semi-active laser guided rockets.

In June 2018, an order was placed for 20 H145Ms by Hungary for the Hungarian Air Force equipped with HForce weapon system. All delivered by the end of 2021. First live firing exercise was held in September 2021 using 20 mm cannon pods.

In July 2018, an order was placed by Luxembourg for 2 H145Ms for the Luxembourg Army that will be dual role for use by the Luxembourg Police.

In August 2021, the German Air Force deployed two H145Ms to Hamid Karzai International Airport to assist in evacuation operations in the aftermath of the fall of Kabul.

On 24 February 2023, Belgian newspaper, De Morgen, has noted that the Belgian Air Force has selected the H145M as its new light utility helicopter. A government approval for an order for 15 aircraft is expected to be finalized on March 10, 2023 during a defence commission meeting. these will replace the 4 NH90-TTH and the last remaining Agusta A109BAi's in BAF service.

Variants

EC145
Basic model introduced, derived from preceding BK 117 C-1; this variant is powered by Turbomeca Arriel 1E2 turboshaft engines and has a conventional high boom tail rotor. EC145 is a marketing name for the BK 117 C-2.
ACH145
Corporate model by Airbus Corporate Helicopters offered in two product lines: the ACH Line, formerly the Stylence, and the Mercedes-Benz Style, part of the ACH Editions product line. The ACH145 interior options include seating configurations, upholstery, trim, lighting, carpet and storage. The Mercedes-Benz Style airframe has a redesigned nose and modified skids. 
EC145e
Variant of the base EC145 for utility purposes, featuring new Garmin G500H digital cockpit and the removal of some elements such as the automatic flight control system, along with the adoption of a standardised interior, for weight reduction purposes. EC145e is a marketing name for the BK 117 C-2e.

H145
Updated version of EC145, initially designated as EC145 T2. Features a fenestron shrouded tail rotor rather than a conventional tail rotor. Other changes include the installation of more powerful ( Arriel 2E engines, and various new avionics; it has a maximum takeoff weight of 3700 kg.Broadbent 2012, pp. 67–68. In 2019 Airbus Helicopters announced a new variant of the type with a newly designed 5-blade bearingless main rotor system, increasing useful load by 150 kg and max takeoff weight to 3800 kg; it achieved EASA certification in June 2020. Airbus expects to deliver the last production H145 with the standard 4-blade rotor in February 2021, after which the production line will only assemble the new 5-blade type; the 4-bladed H145s already in service can also be retrofitted to the new 5-blade standard. H145 is a marketing name for both the BK 117 D-2 (4-blade main rotor variant) and BK 117 D-3 (5-blade main rotor variant).

H145 D3
 Updated Version of the H145 with 5-blade main rotor. In comparison to the D-2, the effective loading weight of the D-3 is increased by 150 kg due to a 100 kg increase in the maximum total weight and a 50 kg decrease in the aircraft weight.
H145M
Militarized version of the H145; briefly designated as EC645 T2. It can be outfitted with ballistic protection, self-sealing fuel tanks, electro optical/infrared sensor, retractable pintle-mounted 7.62mm FN MAG machine guns or M134 miniguns, military-grade communications and navigational systems and an electronic warfare self-protection system. The H145M's HForce weapon system can precisely aim 12,7 mm and 20 mm gun pods and 70 mm guided and unguided rockets. Anti-armor capability will be provided by integrating SPIKE ER2 missile to the helicopter's armament.
UH-72A Lakota
 A militarised Light Utility Helicopter based on the basic EC145 model; operated by the US Army.
Jupiter HT1
 Used by UK Armed Forces to train search and rescue pilots.

 Operators 

In 2019, more than 1300 EC145s were in service around the world which in 2012 was reported as 34 countries and around 100 customers.

Military

 Albanian Air Force (3 H145M)

 Belgian Air Force (20 H145M on order, 15 for Air Force, 5 for the Belgian Federal Police)

 Bolivian Air Force

 Cayman Islands Regiment

 Cypriot National Guard - Ordered six H145M with an option for another six to replace the ageing Soviet squadron 

 Ecuadorian Air Force - received two H145Ms in 2020, with four more delivered by April 2021.

French Gendarmerie

 German Air Force (15 H145M LUH SOF)
 German Army Aviation Corps (7 H145 LUH SAR)

 Hungarian Armed Forces (20 H145M)

 Kazakhstan Air Force

 Luxembourg Army (2 H145M)"Le premier de deux nouveaux hélicoptères militaires est accueilli par l'Armée et la Police". LËTZEBUERGER ARMÉI, 15 November 2019.
 

 Serbian Air Force and Air Defence (5 H145M, 10 more on order)

 Royal Thai Army (H145)
 Royal Thai Army (UH-72A Lakota)
 Royal Thai Navy (H145M)

 Royal Air Force
No. 1 Flying Training School RAF
 No. 202 Squadron RAF

 United States Army see UH-72 Lakota

Civilian and government

 Royal Flying Doctor Service

Military Police of Rio de Janeiro State
Military Police of Espirito Santo State
Bahia State Public Security
Maranhão State Public Security 
Ceará Public Security 
 Minas Gerais Fire Department 

Royal Canadian Mounted Police
STARS Air Ambulance

Royal Cayman Islands Police Service Air Operations Unit

Civil Defence

ADAC
Landespolizei
DRF

Israel Police

 State Border Guard Service

Royal Moroccan Gendarmerie

Namibian Police Force

 
ANWB Medical Air Assistance
 
 Canterbury West Coast Air Rescue 
 Otago Rescue Helicopter Trust

Norsk Luftambulanse

National Police of Peru

Philippine Coast Guard

Ministry of Interior (23 on order)

Medical Emergency System (Department of Health of the Government of Catalonia)

Rega Air Rescue Service

 Serbian police (4 H145M)

State Emergency Service of Ukraine
Ministry of Interior (10 H145 on order, 8 with five-blade rotor)

 East Anglian Air Ambulance
Metropolitan Police Service replaced their 3 AS355Ns with EC145s before transferring them to National Police Air Service.
Scottish Ambulance Service
Police Service of Northern Ireland
AirMed Utah
Avera Careflight  
Memorial Hermann Life Flight

Stanford Life Flight
Sanford Health Airmed
Suffolk County Police Department
Texas Department of Public Safety
Las Vegas Metropolitan Police Department
OSF HealthCare Life Flight based in Peoria, IL
Boston MedFlight
Duke Life Flight
Thomas Jefferson University JeffSTAT
Riverside County Sheriff's Department

Specifications (EC145 C-2)

See also

References

Citations

Bibliography
 Broadbent, Mark. "Eurocopter Tango Two". Air International, March 2012, Vol 82 No 3. Stamford, UK: Key Publishing. . pp. 66–69.
 Gray, Peter. "Flight test: Eurocopter EC145." Flight International, 11 February 2002. pp. 30–34.
 Prétat, Samuel. EC 145 & UH-72''. Éditions Minimonde76

External links

 
 Eurocopter EC145 on Rega.ch 
 Pilot Report: When less is more

1990s German helicopters
1990s international civil utility aircraft
Airbus Helicopters aircraft
Kawasaki aircraft
1990s Japanese helicopters
Twin-turbine helicopters
Aircraft first flown in 1999